Gustavo Javier Canales Bustos (born 30 March 1982) is a Chilean football coach and former player who played as a forward.

Club career
He began his career at hometown Deportivo Roca in 2004. After his spells at Cipolletti, Aldosivi and Guillermo Brown, in 2007 he joined Chilean outfit Deportes La Serena.

In January 2010 the Argentinian club River Plate signed the striker from Unión Española on a 70% to 30% joint ownership deal for around $1 million until 2013. After a poor season with los millonarios, Canales returned to Chile to play for Unión Española.

Canales joined Chinese Super League side Dalian Aerbin on 11 February 2012 for a fee of US$2.6 million and signing a three-year deal. Canales scored four goals in his first five league games with Dalian Aerbin.

In 2013 Canales was suspended for 3 months after he failed a drug test.

International career
On 3 November 2011, was reported that Chile national team coach Claudio Borghi dispensed with Mauricio Pinilla due to knee injury, so he called Canales to play the 2014 World Cup qualification games with Uruguay and Paraguay amid a difficult environment that lived the team marked by showbiz scandals.

He internationally debuted on 11 November during the Uruguayan 4–0 thrash over Chile coming on as a 73rd-minute substitute.

In 2014, received a call-up from now manager Jorge Sampaoli (who coached him at Universidad de Chile) to play against Costa Rica at Coquimbo on 22 January, related to final nominees preparation to 23-man World Cup squad. However it was reported on 18 January that he would miss the game due to injury. Months later Canales was considered in the 30-provisional-man squad because his good shape shown at Unión Española despite missing the previous friendly matches.

Coaching career 
In March 2021, he assumed as coach of the Unión Española U21 team. In September 2022, he took in charge of Unión Española senior team as interim manager after César Bravo was released.

On 21 November 2022, Unión Española announced that Canales was leaving the role of manager, and would not take any other role at the club.

Personal life 
At the end of 2010, he was naturalized Chilean nationality law, both his mother and his grandmother are Chilean.

Career statistics

Honours

Club 
Universidad de Chile
Primera División de Chile (3): 2011 Apertura, 2011 Clausura, 2014 Apertura
Copa Sudamericana: 2011
Copa Chile: 2015
Supercopa de Chile: 2015

Unión Española
Primera División de Chile: 2013 Transición
Supercopa de Chile: 2013

Arsenal de Sarandí
Supercopa Argentina: 2012

References

External links
 BDFA profile
 Universidad de Chile profile 
 Soccerway profile

1982 births
Living people
People from General Roca
Argentine footballers
Argentine sportspeople of Chilean descent
Argentine emigrants to Chile
Argentine expatriate footballers
Citizens of Chile through descent
Chilean people of Argentine descent
Chilean footballers
Chilean expatriate footballers
Chile international footballers
Deportivo Roca players
Club Cipolletti footballers
Aldosivi footballers
Guillermo Brown de Puerto Madryn footballers
Deportes La Serena footballers
Once Caldas footballers
Unión Española footballers
Club Atlético River Plate footballers
Universidad de Chile footballers
Dalian Professional F.C. players
Arsenal de Sarandí footballers
Botafogo de Futebol e Regatas players
Torneo Argentino B players
Primera Nacional players
Torneo Argentino A players
Chilean Primera División players
Categoría Primera A players
Argentine Primera División players
Chinese Super League players
Campeonato Brasileiro Série A players
Argentine expatriate sportspeople in Chile
Argentine expatriate sportspeople in Colombia
Argentine expatriate sportspeople in China
Argentine expatriate sportspeople in Brazil
Naturalized citizens of Chile
Chilean expatriate sportspeople in China
Chilean expatriate sportspeople in Brazil
Expatriate footballers in Chile
Expatriate footballers in Colombia
Expatriate footballers in China
Expatriate footballers in Brazil
Doping cases in association football
Association football forwards
Chilean football managers
Unión Española managers
Chilean Primera División managers